Riddleton is an unincorporated community in Smith County, Tennessee, United States. It is located along Tennessee State Route 25 (Dixon Springs Highway) between Dixon Springs and Carthage. Riddleton has a post office, with ZIP code 37151.

Notes

Unincorporated communities in Houston County, Tennessee
Unincorporated communities in Tennessee